The  is an open-air museum and amusement park near Inuyama, Aichi Prefecture, Japan.

History 
Little World was founded in 1983.

Features 
The park features buildings from more than 20 countries, either relocated from their native countries or built in the style of those countries. Countries represented include France, Germany, India, Indonesia, Italy, Micronesia, Peru, Tanzania, Thailand, Taiwan, Turkey, and the United States. Visitors can wear traditional ethnic costumes of France, Germany, Korea, and Okinawa. The site area is 1.23 million square meters, which is equivalent to the second largest site area in Japanese theme parks.

The museum holds regular events and concerts that showcase the countries exhibited.

Gallery

External links 

Homepage of The Little World Museum of Man

References 

Museums in Aichi Prefecture
Museums established in 1970
1970 establishments in Japan
Anthropology museums
Open-air museums in Japan
Inuyama, Aichi